Hugh Salkeld may refer to:

Hugh Salkeld (died 1397/8), MP for Westmorland
Hugh Salkeld (died c.1440), MP for Westmorland, son of above